Cloudy Rhodes is an Australian photographer and filmmaker.  Their short film, Lo Loves You played along with the American film First Girl I Loved in Australia in 2017.  Both films explored LGBT issues.  Rhodes has directed a music video for Sonic Youth.  The video uses Australian landscape as a backdrop for homoerotic imagery.  Their photography has drawn attention from major magazines. They are a photographer for Teen Vogue. Rhodes has been profiled for their surfing.

Personal life
Rhodes was born in Palm Beach, Florida, to parents who were both painters, and grew up in Sydney, Australia.  Their brother is also a filmmaker. Rhodes is openly lesbian.

See also 
 List of female film and television directors
 List of lesbian filmmakers
 List of LGBT-related films directed by women

References

Living people
Australian women photographers
Australian surfers
LGBT film directors
LGBT people from Florida
Year of birth missing (living people)
Lesbian sportswomen
Lesbian photographers
Australian LGBT sportspeople
Australian LGBT photographers
Australian lesbian artists
LGBT surfers
21st-century Australian LGBT people